Mogliano Veneto is a town and comune in the province of Treviso, Veneto, northern Italy, located halfway between Mestre (Venice) and Treviso.

Culture
Mogliano is well known for the Medieval festival, which takes place in September of every year, as well as for the Christmas market which takes place from 1–10 December of every year with market stalls being set up in Piazza Pio X by cottage industries from as far away as Perugia.

Transport
Mogliano is cut in two by a busy street, known as Terraglio, a historical road linking Treviso and Mestre/Venice. Mogliano Veneto railway station is on the busy Venice–Udine railway and, like Mestre, serves as a dormitory town for people working in the surrounding industrial areas. Train services operate to Venice, Treviso, Udine and Trieste.

Twin towns
 Ricadi, Italy
 Mogliano, Italy
 Mostar, Bosnia-Herzegovina

Sports
F.C. Union Pro Mogliano-Preganziol A.S.D. is the Italian football team of the city and of Preganziol and was founded in 2012 after the merge of A.S.D. Pro Mogliano Calcio (founded in 1928) and ASD Union Preganziol (founded in 1962).  Currently it plays in Italy's Serie D after the promotion from Eccellenza Veneto Girone B in the 2013–14 season.

Its home ground is Stadio Comunale with 2,300 seats of the city. The team's colors are white and blue.

The presidents are Maurizio Michielan and Marco Gaiba. The manager is Francesco Feltrin.

References 

Cities and towns in Veneto